Reid is an unincorporated community in Calhoun County, Mississippi, United States.

A post office operated under the name Reid from 1880 to 1929.

Gulf Oil Corporation operated a natural gas well in Reid prior to it being shut-in.

References

Unincorporated communities in Calhoun County, Mississippi
Unincorporated communities in Mississippi